Gonospira deshayesi is a species of air-breathing land snail, terrestrial pulmonate gastropod mollusk in the family Streptaxidae.

This species is endemic to Réunion, an island located in the Indian Ocean, east of Madagascar.

References

Gonospira
Gastropods described in 1868
Taxonomy articles created by Polbot